Mariano Francisco Saynez Mendoza (20 September 1942 – 4 November 2020) was an admiral in the Mexican Navy.

Career
Born in Veracruz, Veracruz, Saynez enrolled in the Navy on 22 January 1959 and graduated as a cadet of the Heroic Naval Academy and in 1964 was promoted to midshipman Body. He attended the Naval Studies Center of Mexico (CESNAV) where he performed during the Command and General Staff Diploma, obtaining the latter first with an average of 92.67, also well attended Higher Command and National Mexican Security and the Inter-American Defense College in Washington, DC, conducted the course Defense Superior Continental.

Admiral Saynez served as Secretary of Navy (SEMAR) under President Felipe Calderón from 1 December 2006 to 30 November 2012. In 2012 the government of the United States praised him for his work.

Saynez died on 4 November 2020 at the age of 78.

References

1942 births
2020 deaths
People from Veracruz (city)
People of the Mexican Drug War
Mexican admirals
20th-century Mexican military personnel